Legends of the Shires is the eleventh studio album by progressive metal band Threshold, released on September 8, 2017. It is the first album to feature vocalist Glynn Morgan since the band's second album Psychedelicatessen in 1994; Morgan returned to Threshold following Damian Wilson's departure in 2017.

The album is a concept album about "a nation trying to find itself" according to lyricist Richard West. However, they admit that their intent in many cases was to have 2 different parallel stories or interpretations—for example, in addition to the nation-based theme, that the songs be just as applicable on a personal level.

Track listing
All tracks written by Karl Groom and Richard West, except where noted.

Disc one

Disc two

Personnel
Taken from the liner notes of the album.

Threshold
 Glynn Morgan – vocals
 Karl Groom – guitars, production, mixing
 Richard West – keyboards, production
 Steve Anderson – bass
 Johanne James – drums

Additional personnel
 Jon Jeary – vocals on "The Shire (Part 3)"
 Mika Jussila – mastering
 Elena Dudina – cover image
 Rob Burress – band photography

Charts

References

2017 albums
Threshold (band) albums
Nuclear Blast albums
Albums produced by Karl Groom